Today and Tomorrow is the fourth album by jazz pianist McCoy Tyner. It was recorded for the Impulse! label in 1963 and 1964. The two sessions featured performances by Tyner with bassist Jimmy Garrison, drummer Albert Heath, tenor saxophonist John Gilmore, trumpeter Thad Jones, alto saxophonist Frank Strozier, bassist  Butch Warren and drummer Elvin Jones.

Reception
The Allmusic review by Scott Yanow states that "Virtually all of McCoy Tyner's recordings are easily recommended and this CD has more variety than most of his Impulses".

Track listing
All compositions by McCoy Tyner except where noted

 "Contemporary Focus" - 8:28
 "A Night in Tunisia" (Gillespie) - 5:07
 "T 'N A Blues" (Jones) - 4:05
 "Autumn Leaves" (Kosma) - 6:10
 "Three Flowers" - 10:12
 "When Sunny Gets Blue" (Marvin Fisher, Segal) - 4:42

The 1991 remastered edition features a different running order, grouping together the tracks from the two sessions. It also adds three tracks from the second session that were initially released on Impulse's The Definitive Jazz Scene series of LP compilations:

 Contemporary Focus" - 8:28
 "T 'N A Blues" - 4:05
 "Three Flowers" - 10:12
 "A Night in Tunisia" - 5:07
 "Autumn Leaves" - 6:10
 "When Sunny Gets Blue" - 4:42
 "You'd Be So Nice to Come Home To" (Porter) - 4:52
 "Five Spot After Dark" (Golson) - 4:52
 "Flapstick Blues" - 2:15

Tracks 4-9 recorded on June 4, 1963; tracks 1-3 recorded on February 4, 1964

Personnel
McCoy Tyner - piano
Jimmy Garrison - bass (tracks 4-9)
Albert Heath - drums (4-9)
John Gilmore - tenor saxophone (1-3)
Thad Jones - trumpet (1-3)
Frank Strozier - alto saxophone (1-3)
Butch Warren - bass (1-3)
Elvin Jones - drums (1-3)

References

1964 albums
McCoy Tyner albums
Albums produced by Bob Thiele
Impulse! Records albums
Albums recorded at Van Gelder Studio